Vřesovice is a municipality and village in Hodonín District in the South Moravian Region of the Czech Republic. It has about 600 inhabitants.

Notable people
Oldřich Pechal (1913–1942), soldier and resistance fighter

References

Villages in Hodonín District
Moravian Slovakia